Gary Gower (born 10 July 1952) is a South African cricketer. He played in 52 first-class and 18 List A matches for Border from 1973/74 to 1989/90.

See also
 List of Border representative cricketers

References

External links
 

1952 births
Living people
South African cricketers
Border cricketers
Cricketers from East London, Eastern Cape